Hayle railway station serves the small town of Hayle, Cornwall, United Kingdom. Great Western Railway manage the station and operate most train services.

It is  measured from  via .

History
The station was opened by the West Cornwall Railway on 11 March 1852 when it replaced the original Hayle Railway terminus, located in what is now the Isis RNLI Memorial Gardens. It was demolished shortly after the end of World War II.

During the 19th century, Hayle was a busy junction with goods lines running all round the town, many connecting from the embankment which is still visible behind the 'up' platform. However, the decline of shipping in the Hayle estuary meant that these freight lines were no longer of any use and were closed in 1981. Hayle signal box was closed and demolished at the same time.

Station masters

James Henry Walters ca. 1867 - 1874 (killed at  after falling when attempting to enter a moving train)
James Gale 1895 - 1897 (afterwards station master at )
Harry Jack Fisher from 1912 (formerly station master at )
William Henry Harris 1926 - 1933 (formerly station master at St Dennis Junction)
A. Wingett 1933 - 1937
E.T. Roberts 1937 - ???? (formerly station master at )
W. Reynolds 1943 - ???? (formerly station master at )
John Frederick Martin ca. 1950
E.F. Bealey ca. 1959

Description

The main entrance is to the platform served by trains to Penzance, which is approached by a road from Foundry Square. A footpath allows level access to the other platform too, and this continues along the route of a closed railway track down towards the wharves opposite a bridge which leads across the water to the Towans.

A camping coach adjacent to the westbound platform offers holiday accommodation.

Services

References

External links

Railway stations in Cornwall
Former Great Western Railway stations
Railway stations in Great Britain opened in 1852
Railway stations served by Great Western Railway
1852 establishments in England
Hayle
DfT Category F1 stations